Lisbet Kolding  (born 6 April 1965) is a female former Danish footballer. She was part of the Denmark women's national football team.

She competed at the 1996 Summer Olympics, playing 2 matches.

See also
 Denmark at the 1996 Summer Olympics

References

External links
 
 
http://www.soccerpunter.com/players/292381-Lisbet-Kolding
FIFA.com

1965 births
Living people
VSK Aarhus (women) players
Danish women's footballers
Place of birth missing (living people)
Footballers at the 1996 Summer Olympics
Olympic footballers of Denmark
Women's association football midfielders
1995 FIFA Women's World Cup players
1991 FIFA Women's World Cup players
Denmark women's international footballers